Diptilon bivittata is a moth of the subfamily Arctiinae. It was described by Francis Walker in 1864. It is found in Brazil.

References

Euchromiina
Moths described in 1864